The Elevator Museum is a non-profit 501(c)(3) organization in  Massachusetts, United States.

History
In 2011, The Elevator Historical Society opened in a small space in Long Island City, New York. With an exhibit of elevator parts and paraphernalia but due to a lack of funding it closed in 2016. The exhibit items were relocated to a temporary location at The International Union of Elevator Constructors Local 4 Union Hall in 2017, and combined with an extensive collection of artifacts by Stephen K. Comley and his father James F. Comley.

The Comleys funded a move to the Haverhill location, then assembled a board of advisors and directors, and in 2019 received non-profit status for The Elevator Museum.

References

External links
 Museum website

2019 establishments in Massachusetts
Museums established in 2019
Buildings and structures in Haverhill, Massachusetts
Museums in Essex County, Massachusetts
Industry museums in Massachusetts
Transportation museums in Massachusetts
Technology museums in the United States
Elevators